
Peake may refer to:

Places

South Australia
 Hundred of Peake, a cadastral unit
 Peake, South Australia, a town and locality 
 District Council of Peake, a former local government area

Other uses
 Peake (surname), people with the surname Peake

See also
 Peak (disambiguation)